The PP-2000 (Russian: ПП-2000) is a submachine gun/machine pistol made by the KBP Instrument Design Bureau. It was first publicly displayed at the Interpolytech-2004 exhibition in Moscow even though its patent was filed in 2001 and issued in 2003.

Overview 
The PP-2000 is a conventional blowback-operated weapon and weighs 1.5 kg (3.3 lb) empty. The PP-2000 is designed as a close-quarter combat weapon, intended for riot police and special operations forces. In 2008, it was adopted as one of the two standard SMGs of the Russian police (along with the Vityaz-SN).

Design 
It is chambered in 9×19mm Parabellum, and specifically designed to utilize the new Russian 9×19mm 7N21 and 7N31 (Cyrillic: 7Н21 and 7Н31) +P+ armor-piercing versions of the cartridge. This is intended to give the PP-2000 armor-piercing capability comparable to the FN P90 and Heckler & Koch MP7 personal defense weapons while also being able to use common 9mm Parabellum rounds.

One unusual feature is the ability to store a spare 44-round magazine at the rear of the gun, where it also functions as a stock. A wire folding stock is also available. Another unusual feature is that this firearm's charging handle is located directly behind the front sight and folds out of the way when not in use. A similar folding charging handle can be seen on the Heckler & Koch G36.

Gallery

Users 

 : National Security Service.
 : Ministry of Internal Affairs and law enforcement units.

See also 
 Brügger & Thomet MP9
 ST Kinetics CPW
 Steyr TMP
 Heckler & Koch VP70
 List of Russian weaponry

References

Sources 
 9х19 мм пистолет-пулемёт ПП-2000. Руководство по эксплуатации ПП-2000.00.000 РЭ - 2008
 Ilya Shaydurov: Russische Schusswaffen - Typen.Technik.Daten. Motorbuch Verlag, 2010, .

External links 

 
 M.R. Popenker. Modern Firearms – PP-2000
 Modern Firearms – 7N31 Ammunition

9mm Parabellum submachine guns
KBP Instrument Design Bureau products
Machine pistols
Personal defense weapons
Post–Cold War weapons of Russia
Simple blowback firearms
Submachine guns of Russia
Telescoping bolt submachine guns
Weapons and ammunition introduced in 2006